Rottmanner is a surname. Notable people with the surname include:

 Eduard Rottmanner (1809–1843), German composer and organist
 Karl Borromäus Rottmanner (1783–1824), German poet, philosopher, and politician
 Simon Rottmanner (1740–1813), German writer, agrarian reformer, jurist, landowner, and accountant

German-language surnames